Wilhelm Otto Ludwig Specht (22 September 1907, Rastatt – 19 February 1985) was a German mathematician who introduced Specht modules. He also proved the Specht criterion for unitary equivalence of matrices.

Works
 Gruppentheorie. Grundlehren der mathematischen Wissenschaften. Springer, 1956.
 Elementare Beweise der Primzahlsätze. Deutscher Verlag der Wissenschaften, Berlin 1956.
 Algebraische Gleichungen mit reellen oder komplexen Koeffizienten. Enzyklopädie der mathematischen Wissenschaften. 1958.

References

External links
Obituary of Wilhelm Specht (in German).
Photos of Wilhelm Specht

20th-century German mathematicians
1907 births
1985 deaths